Kuakata National Park is IUCN Category II national park and nature reserve in Bangladesh. The park is located at Kalapara Upazila under Patuakhali District. It has been declared as one of the safe zones for vultures as per the Vulture Safe Zone-2 Schedule of the government of Bangladesh.

The park was officially declared as a national park by the government of Bangladesh on 24 October 2010 for the purpose of conservation of flora, fauna, nature and development of tourism facilities. It covers an area of 1613 hectares.

References

National parks of Bangladesh
Patuakhali District
Protected areas established in 2010
2010 establishments in Bangladesh
Forests of Bangladesh